Asansol Arunoday High School is a co-educational school located in Domohani Railway Colony, near Purana station, Mistry Para, Asansol, West Bengal, India.

The school was established in 1958 by the great effort of Anadi Nath Mukherjee and Brihaspati Singh. The medium of education is Hindi and Bengali.

Asansol Arunoday High School has been augmented to 10+2 in the year 2013 with Arts and Commerce. First Batch of 10+2 has been passed out successfully in 2015 and now it's called Asansol Arunoday High School (H. S).

External links
http://wbbse.org/sburdwan.htm

References

High schools and secondary schools in West Bengal
Schools in Paschim Bardhaman district
Education in Asansol
Educational institutions established in 1958
1958 establishments in West Bengal